Major General Valery Ivanovich Flyustikov is a Russian military officer. Since 2018, he has served as the commander of the Russian Special Operations Forces replacing Aleksandr Matovnikov. 

In April 2022, Flyustikov was added to the British government's sanctions list, in relation to the 2022 Russian invasion of Ukraine.

References 

Russian generals
Russian military personnel of the 2022 Russian invasion of Ukraine
Year of birth missing (living people)
Living people